Huai Kum Dam, is on the Nam Phrom River in Kaset Sombun District, Chaiyaphum Province, Thailand. It consists of a rockfill dam with clay core (35.5 metres high and 282 metres long) and a 1.2 MW semi-underground powerhouse which rises four metres high from the ground and 11 metres beneath the surface. The dam forms a reservoir with a storage capacity of 22 million cubic metres to supply water for the downstream irrigation areas of Chulabhorn Dam in Chaiyaphum Province whereas the power plant provides two million kWh of electric energy per year. The king and the queen accompanied by Princess Maha Chakri Sirindhorn and Princess Chulabhorn presided over the inauguration ceremony on 19 December 1980.

References

Dams in the Mekong River Basin
Dams completed in 1980
Dams in Thailand
Hydroelectric power stations in Thailand
Buildings and structures in Chaiyaphum province
1980 establishments in Thailand
Energy infrastructure completed in 1980